James Hudson (born 28 October 1981 in Sutton Coldfield, West Midlands, England) is a former rugby union player 

He was educated at Solihull School, where he gained 1st XV stripes as a lock.

Hudson started his career at Bath Rugby, his form led to a selection for the 2006 Churchill Cup. However, citing a lack of first team rugby, Hudson elected to join London Irish at the end of the 2005–06 season.

During his time at the club, Hudson rotated his role in the second row alongside Bob Casey and Nick Kennedy, however towards the beginning of 2009 he began to take a step up in the pecking order. This led to him starting in the 2008–09 Guinness Premiership semi final, scoring a scored a try against Harlequins at The Stoop as London Irish won 17–0 to book their place in the final. Hudson started the subsequent final, as London Irish lost 10–9 to Leicester Tigers.

The following season Hudson joined the Newcastle Falcons for the 2009–10 season., establishing himself as a regular starter. As a result of this Hudson was nominated as club captain for the 2010-2011 season, something he has continued until this day.

Despite signing a new two-year deal in 2011 it is expected that Hudson will leave Newcastle Falcons upon their impending relegation from the Premiership.

On 19 March 2013, it was announced Hudson would leave Newcastle Falcons to join Gloucester Rugby in the Aviva Premiership on a three-year deal.

On 26 October 2016, Hudson was forced to retire from professional rugby after failing to overcome a serious knee injury.

References

External links 

 Gloucester Rugby profile
 Newcastle Falcons profile
 London Irish profile
 Guinness Premiership profile

1981 births
Living people
Alumni of the University of Bath
Bath Rugby players
English rugby union players
London Irish players
Newcastle Falcons players
People educated at Solihull School
Rugby union locks
Rugby union players from Sutton Coldfield
Team Bath rugby union players